Spodnji Leskovec is a settlement in the valley of Lipnica Creek, a minor tributary of the Drava River in the Haloze Hills in eastern Slovenia. It is part of the Municipality of Videm. The area traditionally belonged to the Styria region. It is now included in the Drava Statistical Region.

There is a small rectangular chapel-shrine with a polygonal apse in the settlement. It was built in 1909.

References

External links
Spodnji Leskovec on Geopedia

Populated places in the Municipality of Videm